Valentin Nikolov (born 18 September 1947) is a Bulgarian fencer. He competed in the team sabre event at the 1972 Summer Olympics.

References

1947 births
Living people
Bulgarian male sabre fencers
Olympic fencers of Bulgaria
Fencers at the 1972 Summer Olympics